Ana Radović (born 21 August 1986 in Sarajevo) is a former Montenegrin handballer. She plays for the Montenegrin national team, and participated at the 2011 World Women's Handball Championship in Brazil. Starting her career in RK Medicinar Šabac, she later played six full seasons for ŽRK Budućnost Podgorica (2006–2012), also winning the Champions League with the Podgorica club (2011–12 season), when she decided it is time for new challenge, and joined KIF Vejen for the 2012–13 season.

References

External links
 

1986 births
Montenegrin female handball players
Handball players at the 2012 Summer Olympics
Olympic handball players of Montenegro
Medalists at the 2012 Summer Olympics
Olympic medalists in handball
Olympic silver medalists for Montenegro
Sportspeople from Sarajevo
Living people
Mediterranean Games medalists in handball
Mediterranean Games bronze medalists for Montenegro
Competitors at the 2009 Mediterranean Games